The 1997 European Open Water Swimming Championships was the fifth edition of the European Open Water Swimming Championships (was part of the 1997 European Aquatics Championships) and took part from 19–24 August 1997 in Sevilla, Spain.

Results

Men

Women

Medal table

See also
 1997 European Aquatics Championships
 List of medalists at the European Open Water Swimming Championships

References

External links
 Ligue Européenne de Natation LEN Official Website

European Open Water Swimming Championships
European Open Water Championships